The 2009–10 ISU Speed Skating World Cup, officially the Essent ISU World Cup Speed Skating 2009–2010, was a series of international speed skating competitions which ran the entire season. The season started on 6 November 2009 in Berlin, Germany, and ended on 14 March 2010 in Heerenveen, Netherlands. Compared to previous seasons, fewer competition weekends were held; the season was restricted due to the 2010 Winter Olympics, which were arranged in Vancouver, Canada, during February 2010. In total, seven competition weekends were held at six different locations, ten cups were contested (five for men, and five for women), and 70 races took place.

The World Cup is organized by the International Skating Union (ISU).

Calendar 

Note: the men's 5000 and 10000 metres were contested as one cup, and the women's 3000 and 5000 metres were contested as one cup, as indicated by the color coding.

World records

World records going into the 2009–10 season.

Men

At the World Cup stop in Salt Lake City on 11 December 2009, Shani Davis of the United States set a new world record on the men's 1500 metres with a time of 1:41.04.

Women

At the World Cup stop in Calgary on 6 December 2009, the Canadian team – consisting of Kristina Groves, Christine Nesbitt and Brittany Schussler – set a new world record on the women's team pursuit with a time of 2:55.79.

At the World Cup stop in Salt Lake City on 11 December 2009, Jenny Wolf of Germany set a new world record on the women's 500 metres with a time of 37.00 seconds.

Men's standings

500 m

1000 m

1500 m

5000 and 10000 m

Team pursuit

Women's standings

500 m

1000 m

1500 m

3000 and 5000 m

Team pursuit

References

External links 
International Skating Union

 
09-10
Isu Speed Skating World Cup, 2009-10
Isu Speed Skating World Cup, 2009-10